Alejandra Guzmán En Vivo is the second live album recorded by Mexican singer Alejandra Guzmán. A DVD with the full concert was also released. The only new track included is a version of "Wild Thing" by Chip Taylor.

Track listing
"Ruge El Corazón" (Marina, Sánchez, Valle) — 03:52
"Toda La Mitad" (Bastante, Antonio Garcia De Diego, Pancho Varona) — 04:11    
"Eternamente Bella" (Florez) — 03:21
"Cuidado Con El Corazón" (Florez) — 05:11
"Mala Hierba" (Marina, Sánchez, Valle) — 03:25    
"Ven" (Octavio Muñoz) — 02:36
"Todo" (Gary Burr, Desmond Child, Jonny Lang) — 04:16    
"Algo Natural" (Jorge Villamisar) — 4:28    
"Reina De Corazónes" (Florez, Valle) — 03:00    
"Hey Güera" (Gian Pietro Felisatti, Florez) — 04:04    
"Loca" (Myra Stella Turner) — 05:00    
"Wild Thing" (Chip Taylor) — 02:58    
"Hacer Él Amor Con Otro" (Felisatti, Florez) — 06:17
"Enemigos" (Sandra Baylac) — 04:00
"De Verdad" (Steve Mandile, Jodi Marr, Julia Sierra) — 03:48    
"Caramelo" (Elsten Creole Torres) — 02:58    
"Mírala, Míralo" (Felisatti, Florez) — 03:38    
"Diablo" (Randy Cantor, Alejandra Guzmán, Jodi Marr) — 04:00    
"Volveré a Amar" (Desmond Child, Richie Supa) — 05:20    
"Popurrí: La Plaga/Popotitos/Pólvora" (Robert Blackwell, John Marascalco, Ian Samwell Ralph, Larry Williams) — 05:09

Personnel 
 Abraham Barrera – piano, keyboards
 Iván Barrera – bass
 Javier Barrera – arranger, drums, musical direction
 Cristhian Cambresy – graphic design
 Oscar Galvan – acoustic guitar, electric guitar
 Alejandro Giacomán – mastering
 Guillermo Gutiérrez – A&R
 Alejandra Guzmán – vocals
 Marielos Labias – chorus
 Antonio Maldonado – mixing
 Jorge Mendoza – digital processing
 Javier Olmedo – coordination, creative consultant
 Gilda Oropeza – A&R
 Daniel Parra – chorus
 Samuel Parra – chorus
 Miguel Pasos – electric guitar 

Alejandra Guzmán live albums
2004 live albums